Carrie Moore (born May 15, 1985) is a former basketball player and current head coach for Harvard.

Playing career
Moore played college basketball at Western Michigan where she finished her career as the program's all-time leading scorer with 2,224 points in 120 games. During her senior year in 2006–07, she was the NCAA scoring leader with 813 points, averaging 25.4 points per game. She became the only MAC player to ever lead the NCAA in scoring. When she scored 34 points in a post-season tournament game against Miami, she became the conference's record holder for points in a single season. During her senior year she set nine school records, including points (2,224), field goals made (759) and free throws made (541). Following an outstanding season, she was named Mid-American Conference's Co-Player of the Year.

Following her collegiate career at Western Michigan, she signed with the Phoenix Mercury to a training camp contract after the 2007 WNBA Pre-Draft Camp. She played in two pre-season games, averaging 8.5 points and 2.0 assists. She then played one year with AZS AJP Gorzów Wielkopolski in the Basket Liga Kobiet in Poland during the 2007–08 season. On April 4, 2008, she signed with the Chicago Sky to a training camp contract.

Coaching career
On December 1, 2008, Moore was named Director of Basketball Operations for Princeton. During her two seasons from 2008 to 2010, she helped lead Princeton to their first NCAA Tournament appearance in 2010, as the Tigers finished the season with a record of 26–3, including 14–0 in Ivy League play.

Creighton
Moore served as an assistant coach for Creighton from 2010 to 2015. In 2012, she helped Creighton advance to the NCAA Tournament for the first time since 2002. In 2014, she helped Marissa Janning become Creighton's first All-American since 1998.

Princeton
On April 18, 2016, Moore was named an assistant coach for Princeton. During her time at Princeton, they won consecutive Ivy League regular season and tournament championships in 2018 and 2019.

North Carolina
On May 14, 2019, Moore was named an assistant coach and recruiting coordinator for North Carolina. This reunited her with former Princeton head coach Courtney Banghart. In her first year, her 2019 recruiting class was ranked No. 10 by ESPNW. In her second year, her 2020 recruiting class was ranked third nationally. Three of those players were named McDonald's All-Americans, making UNC one of just four schools nationally with three or more honorees.

Michigan
On May 7, 2021, Moore was named an assistant coach and recruiting coordinator for Michigan.

Harvard
On April 5, 2022, Moore was named the head coach for Harvard, following the retirement of longtime head coach Kathy Delaney-Smith.

Head coaching record

References

External links
Harvard Profile

Living people
1985 births
American women's basketball coaches
Basketball coaches from Michigan
Basketball players from Michigan
Creighton Bluejays women's basketball coaches
Harvard Crimson women's basketball coaches
Princeton Tigers women's basketball coaches
North Carolina Tar Heels women's basketball coaches
Michigan Wolverines women's basketball coaches
Western Michigan Broncos women's basketball players